Park Hae-mi (born 31 January 1990) is a South Korean sports shooter. She competed in the women's 10 metre air rifle event at the 2016 Summer Olympics. She finished with a score of 414.4 and was placed 19th.

References

External links
 

1990 births
Living people
South Korean female sport shooters
Olympic shooters of South Korea
Shooters at the 2016 Summer Olympics
Place of birth missing (living people)
20th-century South Korean women
21st-century South Korean women